Eminkhyur is a rural locality (a selo) in Suleyman-Stalsky District, Republic of Dagestan, Russia. The population was 3,821 as of 2010. There are 74 streets.

Geography 
Eminkhyur is located 22 km northeast of Kasumkent (the district's administrative centre) by road. Sovetskoye is the nearest rural locality.

References 

Rural localities in Suleyman-Stalsky District